is an infill railway station on the Tokaido Main Line in Kōta, Aichi, Japan, operated by the Central Japan Railway Company (JR Central). It opened on 17 March 2012.

Lines

Station layout
The station consists of one island platform (platforms 1 and 2) and one side platform (platform 3) serving a total of three tracks. The station building has automated ticket machines, TOICA automated turnstiles and is unattended.

Platforms

Adjacent stations

History

The name of the new station was formally announced on 14 July 2011. It opened on 17 March 2012.

Station numbering was introduced to the section of the Tōkaidō Line operated JR Central in March 2018; Kōda Station was assigned station number CA51.

Bus services
A bus service operated by Meitetsu Bus runs from Aimi Station to Kōda Station.

Passenger statistics
In fiscal 2017, the station was used by an average of 1552 passengers daily (boarding passengers only).

Surrounding area
 Aichi Prefectural Kōda High School
 Okazaki Fukuoka Junior High School

See also
 List of railway stations in Japan

References

External links

  
 Kota Town information  

Railway stations in Japan opened in 2012
Stations of Central Japan Railway Company
Railway stations in Aichi Prefecture
Tōkaidō Main Line
Kōta, Aichi